Cossus cossus, the goat moth, is a moth of the family Cossidae. It is found in Northern Africa, Asia and Europe.

Biology 
This is a large heavy moth with a wingspan of 68–96 mm. The wings are greyish brown and marked with fine dark cross lines. The moth flies from April to August depending on the location.

The caterpillars have a red/purple stripe across the back and a black head. They reach a length of 9–10 cm. The caterpillars feed in the trunks and branches of a wide variety of trees (see list below), taking three to five years to mature. The caterpillar holes can be found low on the stem (maximum 1.0–1.5 m above the ground).  When ready to pupate the caterpillar leaves the tree to find a suitable spot.

The species prefer humid environments. Both the larva and moth have a smell reminiscent of goat, hence its name.

As a food
Pliny reported in Natural History that a grub which he gives the name cossus was considered a Roman delicacy after it was fed with flour. Some writers have equated this with Cossus cossus, but Pliny specifies that his cossus is found in oak trees, which makes this identification unlikely. Pliny's cossus is more likely to have been the larva of the beetle Cerambyx heros.

Recorded food plants

It has a preference for Populus, Quercus and Salix.

Taxonomy
Cossus balcanicus Lederer, 1863 from Bulgaria is probably a hybrid between C. cossus and Lamellocossus terebrus (Denis & Schiffermüller, 1775).

Subspecies
Cossus cossus cossus
Cossus cossus albescens  Kitt, 1925 (Kazakhstan, Russia)
Cossus cossus araraticus  Teich, 1896 (Georgia, Azerbaijan, Turkey, Iran)
Cossus cossus armeniacus  Rothschild, 1912 (Turkey)
Cossus cossus chinensis  Rothschild, 1912 (China: Shaanxi)
Cossus cossus dauricus  Yakovlev, 2007 (Russia: Transbaikal)
Cossus cossus dersu  Yakovlev, 2009 (Russia: southern Ussuri, Primorsky Krai)
Cossus cossus deserta  Daniel, 1953 (Mongolia)
Cossus cossus gueruenensis  Friedel, 1977 (Asia Minor)
Cossus cossus kopetdaghi  Yakovlev, 2009 (Turkmenistan)
Cossus cossus kossai  Wiltshire, 1957 (Iraq, Jordan)
Cossus cossus lucifer  Grum-Grshimailo, 1891 (Tibet)
Cossus cossus mongolicus  Erschoff, 1882 (Mongolia)
Cossus cossus omrana  Wiltshire, 1957 (Iraq, Iran)
Cossus cossus tianshanus  Hua, Chou, Fang & Chen, 1990 (Kazakhstan, Kyrgyzstan, Uzbekistan, Tajikistan, Afghanistan)
Cossus cossus uralicus  Seitz, 1912 (Uralsk)

Gallery

References

This information, or an older version, was partially obtained from De Vlinderstichting - Vlindernet – http://www.vlindernet.nl/ (geraadpleegd 18-05-2017).

External links

Goat Moth at UKMoths
Fauna Europaea
A video of a red goat moth caterpillar searching for a pupation site

Cossus
Moths described in 1758
Moths of Japan
Moths of Europe
Moths of Asia
Taxa named by Carl Linnaeus